This article lists important figures and events in Malayan public affairs during the year 1953, together with births and deaths of significant Malayans.

Incumbent political figures

Central level
  Governor of Malaya :
 Sir Gerald Templer
 Chief Minister of Malaya :
 Tunku Abdul Rahman Putra

State level
  Perlis :
 Raja of Perlis : Syed Harun Putra Jamalullail 
 Menteri Besar of Perlis : Raja Ahmad Raja Endut
  Johore :
 Sultan of Johore : Sultan Ibrahim Al-Masyhur
 Menteri Besar of Johore : Syed Abdul Kadir Mohamed 
  Kedah :
 Sultan of Kedah : Sultan Badlishah
 Menteri Besar of Kedah : Mohamad Sheriff Osman
  Kelantan :
 Sultan of Kelantan : Sultan Ibrahim
 Menteri Besar of Kelantan :
 Nik Ahmad Kamil Nik Mahmud (until unknown date)
 Tengku Muhammad Hamzah Raja Muda Long Zainal Abidin (from unknown date)
  Trengganu :
 Sultan of Trengganu : Sultan Ismail Nasiruddin Shah
 Menteri Besar of Trengganu : Raja Kamaruddin Idris
  Selangor :
 Sultan of Selangor : Sultan Sir Hishamuddin Alam Shah Al-Haj 
 Menteri Besar of Selangor : 
 Raja Uda Raja Muhammad (until March)
 Othman Mohamad (from March)
  Penang :
 Monarchs : Queen Elizabeth II
 Residents-Commissioner : Robert Porter Bingham
  Malacca :
 Monarchs : Queen Elizabeth II
 Residents-Commissioner : 
  Negri Sembilan :
 Yang di-Pertuan Besar of Negri Sembilan : Tuanku Abdul Rahman ibni Almarhum Tuanku Muhammad 
 Menteri Besar Negri Sembilan : 
 Abdul Malek Yusuf (until 1 October)
 Shamsuddin Naim (from 1 OCtober)
   Pahang :
 Sultan of Pahang : Sultan Abu Bakar
 Menteri Besar of Pahang : Tengku Mohamad Sultan Ahmad 
  Perak :
 British Adviser of Perak : Ian Blelloch 
 Sultan of Perak : Sultan Yusuf Izzuddin Shah
 Menteri Besar of Perak : Abdul Wahab Toh Muda Abdul Aziz

Events 
 26 March – Opening of Connaught Bridge Power Station by Sir Gerald Templer in Klang, Selangor.
 10 April – The People's Progressive Party was founded by D. R. Seenivasagam.
 3 June – St. Gabriel's Secondary School was established by Brother Louis Gonzaga.
 6 July – Beatty Secondary School was established.
 5 December – Local municipal election were held in George Town, Kuala Lumpur and Malacca.
 Unknown date – Dato' Onn Jaafar dissolved the Independence of Malaya Party (formed Parti Negara in 1954).
 Unknown date – Johor Bahru Tengah Municipal Council was established.
 Unknown date – The Malaya and British Borneo dollar was introduced.
 Unknown date – The Olympic Council of Malaysia was established as Federation of Malaya Olympic Council.
 Unknown date – Tanjong Katong Girls' School was established.
 Unknown date – The Betting Act 1953 was enacted.
 Unknown date – The Common Gaming Houses Act 1953 was enacted.
 Unknown date – The Criminal Justice Act 1953 was enacted.
 Unknown date – The flag of Terengannu was changed to its modern-day counterpart

Births
 1 January – Azmil Mustapha – Actor
 2 January – Mustaffa Noor – Actor (died 1990)
 4 January – Ahmad Zahid Hamidi – Politician and 11th Deputy Prime Minister of Malaysia (2015–2018)
 17 January – Nasir Ali – Actor (died 2008)
 31 January – R. Arumugam – Footballer (died 1988)
 14 February – Raja Nong Chik Raja Zainal Abidin – Politician
 1 April – S. Subramaniam – Politician
 15 April – Hussin Ismail – Deputy Inspector General of Police 
 17 May – Ismail Omar – 9th Inspector General of Police
 22 June – Santokh Singh – Footballer
 26 June – Fauziah Nawi – Actor
 2 July – Sharifah Aini – Singer (died 2014)
 16 July – Ahmad Fuad Ismail – Mayor of Kuala Lumpur
 23 July – Najib Razak – Sixth Prime Minister of Malaysia (2009-2018), also son of second Prime Minister Tun Abdul Razak
 20 October – Awang Sariyan – Linguist
 26 October – Maximus Ongkili – Politician 
 13 November – Mokhtar Dahari – Footballer (died 1991)
 16 November – Anifah Aman – Politician
 23 November – Nasir P. Ramlee – Actor and son of P.Ramlee. (died 2008)
 Unknown date – Julie Dahlan – Actor (died 2015)
 Unknown date – Pandikar Amin Mulia – Politician and former Parliament speaker
 Unknown date – Roslan Md. Yusof – Politician

Deaths

See also
 1953 
 1952 in Malaya | 1954 in Malaya
 History of Malaysia

References

 
1950s in Malaya
Malaya